The 1964 All-Eastern football team consists of American football players chosen by various selectors as the best players at each position among the Eastern colleges and universities during the 1964 NCAA University Division football season.

Offense

Backs 
 Roger Staubach, Navy (AP-1 [qb-tie])
 Archie Roberts, Columbia (AP-1 [qb-tie])
 Floyd Little, Syracuse (AP-1)
 Carl Stichweh, Army (AP-1)
 Jim Nance, Syracuse (AP-1)

Ends
 Jim Whalen, Boston College (AP-1)
 Milt Morin, UMass (AP-1)

Tackles
 John Simko, Penn State (AP-1)
 Jim Freeman, Navy (AP-1)

Guards
 Tom Nissi, Holy Cross (AP-1)
 Ray Popp, Pittsburgh (AP-1)

Center
 Pat Killorin, Syracuse (AP-1)

Defense

Ends
 Bill Cronin, Boston College (AP-1)
 Bud Yosl, Penn State (AP-1)

Tackles
 Al Atkinson, Villanova (AP-1)
 Abbott Lawrence, Yale (AP-1)

Linebackers
 Glen Ressler, Penn State (AP-1)
 Marty Schottenheimer, Pittsburgh (AP-1)
 Stas Maliszewski, Princeton (AP-1)

Backs
 Frank Hershey, Penn State (AP-1)
 Charley Brown, Syracuse (AP-1)
 Cosmo Iacavazzi, Princeton (AP-1)
 Jim McGowan, Boston College (AP-1)

Key
 AP = Associated Press
 UPI = United Press International

See also
 1964 College Football All-America Team

References

All-Eastern
All-Eastern college football teams